Pioneer Village may refer to:

Canada
Black Creek Pioneer Village, a historic site in Toronto, Ontario
Pioneer Village station, a subway station in Toronto, Ontario
Fanshawe Pioneer Village, London, Ontario
Kootenai Brown Pioneer Village, Pincher Creek, Alberta
Lang Pioneer Village Museum, Peterborough, Ontario

South Africa
Pionier Museum, an open-air museum in Pretoria

United States
Pioneer Village, Kentucky, a city
Pioneer Village (Colorado), an open-air museum in Hot Sulphur Springs, Colorado
Pioneer Village (Salem, Massachusetts)
Pioneer Village (Nebraska), a museum and tourist attraction in Minden, Nebraska
Pioneer Village (Utah), a "living museum" in Farmington, Utah
Pioneer Village (Texas), an open-air museum in Corsicana, Texas

Other museums
 Pioneer Museum (disambiguation)

See also
Settlement (migration)